National Route 357 is a national highway of Japan connecting Chūō-ku, Chiba and Yokosuka, Kanagawa in Japan, with a total length of 70 km (43.5 mi). The highway parallels the Bayshore Route.

References

357
Roads in Chiba Prefecture
Roads in Kanagawa Prefecture
Roads in Tokyo
Tokyo Bay